Chang Hung may refer to:

Chang Hong (died 492 BC), scholar, politician, educator and astronomer in ancient China
Zhang Hong (disambiguation)
Zhang Heng (disambiguation)